Loftus Glacier is a valley glacier between Mount Weyant and Mount McLennan, which flows north to join Newall Glacier in Victoria Land, Antarctica. It was named by the Advisory Committee on Antarctic Names in 1964 for Chief Journalist Leo G. Loftus, U.S. Navy, who served five summer seasons at McMurdo Station, 1959–64.

References

Glaciers of Victoria Land
Scott Coast